Krasnoselskaya is a Moscow Metro station in the Krasnoselsky District, Central Administrative Okrug, Moscow. It is on the Sokolnicheskaya Line, between Komsomolskaya and Sokolniki stations. Krasnoselskaya is located under Krasnoprudnaya Street, east of the intersection with Krasnoselskaya Street.

Name
It is named after Krasnoselskaya Street.

History
The section of the Sokolnicheskaya Line between Sokolniki and Komsomolskaya was built under Krasnoprudnaya Street, using the cut and cover method. Construction work on Krasnoselskaya began in spring 1933, and the station opened along with other 9 stations of the line on 15 May 1935.

Design
The planned passenger volume at Krasnoselskaya was relatively low, so the station was built with a narrower platform than the other stations of the first line. The station has one row of ten-sided columns, which are faced with red and yellow Crimean marble. The walls are finished with yellow and red ceramic tile and punctuated at regular intervals by concrete pilasters. The architects of the station were B. Vilenskiy and V. Yershov.

Entrance
Krasnoselskaya was originally planned to have entrances at two ends, but only the western one, located at the northeast corner of Krasnoprudnaya Street and Upper Krasnoselskaya Street, was built. In 2005 the vestibule's original tile floor was replaced with similarly-coloured marble.

References

Moscow Metro stations
Railway stations in Russia opened in 1935
Sokolnicheskaya Line
Railway stations located underground in Russia